Better Angels is a science fiction novel by Howard V. Hendrix first published in 1999.

Better Angels is a prequel to Hendrix's earlier novels Lightpath and Standing Wave, filling in history about how the characters in those novels came to be who they are.

Title
In the novel, "Better angels" is a phrase used by agents of the organization Tetragrammatron to describe what they hope to make humanity into. Tetragrammatron is concerned with ensuring humanity's survival by creating a machine/human transcendences, turning humans into "better angels". The phrase itself comes from the closing of Abraham Lincoln's first inaugural address, in which he said that, despite the rising conflict in the United States, the shared history of Americans would "yet swell the chorus of the Union, when again touched, as surely they will be, by the better angels of our nature."

Release details

Sources and external links

 Official page
 

1999 American novels
1999 science fiction novels
Transhumanist books